Patrick Demers is a film director from Montreal, born in 1969 in Saint-Eustache, Quebec.

Biography 
Following his graduation from film school at the age of 22, Demers traveled around the world alone over six months with a handheld camera for La Course destination monde (Radio-Canada Television) and started shooting.

After a few years working as a director in the television and advertising industries, his first short fiction film, Discharge (Décharge), won the award for Best Canadian Short Film at the Toronto International Film Festival. In 2003 he wrote and directed "Dans un spoutnik", an animated music video for Daniel Bélanger which won several awards in the ADISQ Gala and at the MuchMusic Video Awards that year. His next documentary, Regular or Super: Views on Mies van der Rohe, that he co-directed and edited, won Best Canadian Work at the Festival International du Film sur l'Art en 2004.

Suspicions (Jaloux), his first feature film, was released in 2010. The independent movie was produced by Productions Kinesis and was selected by the Karlovy Vary International Film Festival and by the Toronto International Film Festival while also opening the Canadian Front at the Museum of Modern Art in 2011. Origami (2017) premiered at the Fantasia International Film Festival where it won the Barry Convex Special Jury Prize for its deft direction, sophisticated visual aesthetic, strong performances, and the successful blending of genres in a complex story told in a refreshingly unconventional manner.

Filmography

Shorts 

 1987 - Ma dernière cigarette
 1988 - Le refus
 1989 — Brand New Flambant Neuf
 1990 - monsieurmadamechose
 1991 - Lamenta
 1999 - Discharge (Décharge)
 2004 - Le Collet

Animation 

 2003 - "Dans un spoutnik" (music video for Daniel Bélanger)
 2005 - "Heureux d'un printemps"

Documentary 

 2004 Regular or Super: Views on Mies van der Rohe

Feature films 
 2010 - Suspicions (Jaloux)
 2017 - Origami

References

External links 
 

Film directors from Montreal
1969 births
People from Saint-Eustache, Quebec
Living people
Canadian music video directors